Frank Reyes born June 4, 1969, he is one of the best known bachata artists, famous throughout Latin America. He was born in the town of Tenares in the Dominican Republic. Reyes discovered his musical talent when he was a young boy. He and his brothers started their own musical group and had great singing talent. When he was only 12 years old, he decided to travel to Santo Domingo where he worked hard and had many jobs, always dreaming of having his own business. Because he had a beautiful voice he became very successful over the years.

As he got older he recorded his first album Tu serás mi reina and became the self-appointed "prince of bachata" (El príncipe de la bachata).

Discography

Studio 
 1991: Tú Serás Mi Reina
 1993: Si El Amor Condena, Estoy Condenado
 1994: Bachata con Categoría
 1995: Regresó Mi Amor Bonito
 1996: El Antojito
 1996: El Príncipe
 1998: Vine A Decirte Adiós
 1999: Extraño Mi Pueblo
 2000: Amor En Silencio
 2002: Déjame Entrar En Ti
 2004: Cuando Se Quiere Se Puede
 2005: Dosis De Amor
 2007: Pienso En Ti
 2007: Te Regalo El Mar 2009: Sigue Tu Vida 2012: Soy Tuyo 2014: Noche De Pasión 2016: Devuélveme Mi Libertad 2021: Aventurero Live 
 2002: Bachata De Gala 2004: En Vivo 2005: From Santo Domingo Live! 2007: Tour 2007 Compilation 
 1997: Estelares De Frank Reyes 2000: Éxitos 2009: Lo Mejor De Lo Mejor 2010: Éxitos Eternos 2011: Mega Mix Hits''

1969 births
Living people
21st-century Dominican Republic male singers
Bachata musicians
Dominican Republic songwriters
Male songwriters
20th-century Dominican Republic male singers
Spanish-language singers